Adaga (Kaitag: Адагъа; Dargwa: Адагъай) is a rural locality (a selo) in Shilyaginsky Selsoviet, Kaytagsky District, Republic of Dagestan, Russia. In 2010, the population was 163. There are 6 streets.

Geography 
Adaga is located 20 km southwest of Madzhalis (the district's administrative centre) by road. Kulidzha and Shilyagi are the nearest rural localities.

Nationalities 
Many Dargins live in Adaga.

References 

Rural localities in Kaytagsky District